Ab Kharak (also Romanized as Āb Khārak; also known as Ānjārak) is a village in Jabal Rural District, Kuhpayeh District, Isfahan County, Isfahan Province, Iran. At the 2006 census, its population was 60, in 9 families.

References 

Populated places in Isfahan County